Keith Kirton (28 February 1928 – 3 August 2009) was a South African cricketer. He played in 73 first-class matches from 1947/48 to 1963/64.

References

External links
 

1928 births
2009 deaths
South African cricketers
Border cricketers
Eastern Province cricketers
Sportspeople from Qonce